The 2021 National Invitation Tournament was a single-elimination tournament of 16 NCAA Division I men's college basketball teams that had not been selected to participate in the 2021 NCAA tournament. The Tournament began on March 17 and ended on March 28. All rounds were played at the Comerica Center in Frisco, Texas or the UNT Coliseum in Denton, Texas. First-round games began on Wednesday, March 17, and was played through Saturday, March 20. Quarterfinals also took place Thursday, March 25. The semifinals and championship took place Saturday and Sunday, March 27 and 28. The 2021 tournament also featured a third-place game Sunday, March 28, which hadn’t been played at the NIT since 2003. Also, the final game to be played was not the championship, but rather the third-place game.
This was the first NIT in which the semifinals and final were not played in New York City.

Participants
Teams and pairings for the 2021 NIT were released by the NIT Committee at 8:30 p.m. Eastern time Sunday, March 14, on ESPNU. Because of the reduced field size, halved from 2019's tournament field, all 16 teams were selected as at-large participants, and there were no automatic qualifiers for the 2021 NIT. In 2019, Texas won the NIT title. The 2020 tournament was canceled due to the COVID-19 pandemic.

Automatic qualifiers
There were no automatic qualifiers in the 2021 NIT due to the reduced field size.

At-large bids
The following teams were awarded NIT berths.

Bracket  
The field of 16 teams was announced on March 14 on ESPNU.

Media
ESPN, Inc. broadcast all NIT games on ESPN or ESPN2. The semifinals and finals were broadcast on ESPN. Westwood One had exclusive radio rights to the semifinals and the championship.

See also
2021 Women's National Invitation Tournament

References

National Invitation Tournament
National Invitation Tournament
Basketball in the Dallas–Fort Worth metroplex
College sports in Texas
National Invitation Tournament
National Invitation Tournament
Sports competitions in Texas
Sports in Denton, Texas
Sports in Frisco, Texas
Events in Denton, Texas